Kenneth Hugdahl (born 15 January 1948, in Östersund, Sweden) is a Swedish psychologist.

He took his doctor's degree at the Uppsala University in 1977. He worked as a researcher there from 1980, and in 1984 he was appointed professor at the University of Bergen. His main research interests are brain asymmetry and dichotic listening, cognitive dysfunction in schizophrenia, and neurobiology of auditory hallucinations. He has published over 300 articles in international peer reviewed journals, including in high impact factor journals, such as Brain (journal)  and Proceedings of the National Academy of Sciences of the United States of America, and various books, among them Psychophysiology: The Mind-Body Perspective (1995), Experimental Methods in Neuropsychology (2002) and The Asymmetrical Brain (2002) (together with Prof. Richard Davidson). He also edited the Scandinavian Journal of Psychology from 1990 to 2004.

He was a member of the Research Council of Norway from 1988 to 1989, and of the MacArthur Foundation from 1990 to 2000. He is a member of the Norwegian Academy of Science and Letters. He is currently the Head of the Bergen fMRI Group which initiated use of functional magnetic resonance imaging in neuroscience in Norway and the Nordic countries in the 1990s.

References

1948 births
Living people
Norwegian psychologists
Uppsala University alumni
Academic staff of the University of Bergen
Members of the Norwegian Academy of Science and Letters
Swedish psychologists